Chernyshevskaya is a station on the Kirovsko-Vyborgskaya Line of Saint Petersburg Metro, opened on September 1, 1958. It is a deep underground pylon station at  depth with a short central hall. The station is named after Chernyshevsky Prospekt, which is in turn named after Russian materialist philosopher and writer Nikolai Chernyshevsky. This station was part of the second stretch of the Saint Petersburg Metro built. While construction was about to start, a rule was created that no more stations should be ornately decorated, such as the stations between Avtovo and Ploshchad Vosstaniya (the first stretch built).

External links

Saint Petersburg Metro stations
Railway stations in Russia opened in 1958
Railway stations located underground in Russia